Frederick Hall (24 November 1924 – April 2006) was an English professional footballer who played in the Football League for Birmingham City. In later life he was President of the Huntingdonshire Football Association.

Hall was born in Worksop, Nottinghamshire. He was working as a coal miner when he signed for Birmingham City in March 1947. A centre forward, Hall scored on his debut in the Second Division on 5 April 1947 in a 2–1 home win against Fulham, and kept his place for the next two games. Not selected again until November 1949, when he also scored, he went on to play for Southern League club Bedford Town and Eynesbury Rovers of the Eastern Counties League.

Hall later managed Eynesbury as well as Huntingdonshire County representative sides. He became a member of the Huntingdonshire Football Association, and was appointed its president in 1991. He died in 2006 after a long illness at the age of 81.

References

1924 births
2006 deaths
Footballers from Worksop
English footballers
Association football forwards
Birmingham City F.C. players
Bedford Town F.C. players
Eynesbury Rovers F.C. players
English Football League players
Southern Football League players
English football managers
Eynesbury Rovers F.C. managers
Place of death missing